Alexander Wilson Crozier (9 July 1904 – 19 June 1974) was an Australian rules footballer who played with  in the Victorian Football League (VFL).

Early life
The son of John Crozier (1870–1930) and Agnes Catherine Crozier, nee Alexander (1879–1948), Alexander Wilson Crozier was born at Kensington on 9 July 1904.

Football
Crozier joined Hawthorn at the start of the 1926 VFL season from Caulfield. After spending almost all season in the reserves he played in the final game of the season against Melbourne. Despite not making the senior squad at the start of the year he was frequently named in the better players in the reserves in 1927 and played another three senior games.

Later life
In 1934 Alec Crozier married Lorna Pearl Tepper and they lived in various areas in Melbourne until his death in June 1974. He was cremated at Fawkner Memorial Park.

References

External links 

1904 births
1974 deaths
Australian rules footballers from Melbourne
Hawthorn Football Club players
People from Kensington, Victoria